Passenger is the only studio album by alternative metal band Passenger. It was released through Century Media Records in 2003.

Track listing
 "In Reverse" – 2:56
 "In My Head" – 4:15
 "For You" – 2:58
 "Just the Same" – 3:13
 "Carnival Diaries" – 3:55
 "Circus" – 4:17
 "Rain" – 3:14
 "Circles" – 4:44
 "I Die Slowly" – 3:36
 "Used" – 3:52
 "Eyes of My Mind" – 5:28
 "Drowning City (demo)" (Japan bonus track)
 "Clowns (demo)" (Japan bonus track)

Personnel
Passenger
 Anders Fridén – vocals
 Niclas Engelin – guitar
 Patrik J. Sten – drums
 Håkan Skoger – bass

Additional personnel
 Pierre J. Sten – keyboards, programming, sampling
Niklas Sundin – album art

References

2003 debut albums
Passenger (Swedish band) albums
Century Media Records albums